Hebius celebicus the Sulawesi keelback, is a species of snake of the family Colubridae. The snake is found in Indonesia.

References 

celebicus
Reptiles of Indonesia
Reptiles described in 1878
Taxa named by Wilhelm Peters
Taxa named by Giacomo Doria